Anastasiia Kostyantinivna Arkhypova (born 29 December 2003) is a Ukrainian figure skater. She is a two-time Ukrainian national senior champion (2018, 2019). She placed 13th at the 2018 World Junior Championships.

Career

Early years 
Arkhypova began learning to skate in 2006. As a young child, she was coached by Olena Mihotina. She won silver at two consecutive Ukrainian Junior Championships, placing second to Anastasia Hozhva in the 2015–2016 season and Sofiia Nesterova the following season.

2017–2018 season 
Arkhypova began competing internationally, coached by Maryna Amirkhanova in Kyiv. It was her first season of age-eligibility for junior-level ISU competitions. Making her ISU Junior Grand Prix (JGP) debut, she placed 7th in Riga (Latvia) in September 2017 and had the same result in Gdańsk (Poland) the following month. In December, she won the Ukrainian national senior title ahead of defending champion Anna Khnychenkova.

Arkhypova also took gold at the Ukrainian Junior Championships in January 2018 and in the junior ladies' event at the Toruń Cup in February. In March, she qualified to the final segment at the 2018 World Junior Championships in Sofia, Bulgaria. Ranked 10th in the short program and 16th in the free skate, she finished 13th overall.

2018–2019 season 
Arkhypova began her season at the 2018 JGP in Kaunas, Lithuania. She finished fourth overall in the event, and set new personal bests in both the short and the free program as well as in overall competition score.

Arkhypova was scheduled to compete at JGP Armenia but was forced to withdraw due to injury.

2019–2020 season 
Arkhypova placed twelfth in both of her assignments on the Junior Grand Prix, the 2019 JGP Latvia and 2019 JGP Croatia.

2020–2021 season 
Arkhypova made her senior World debut at the 2021 World Championships in Stockholm, placing thirty-fifth.

Programs

Competitive highlights 
CS: Challenger Series; JGP: Junior Grand Prix

Detailed results

References

External links 
 

2003 births
Ukrainian female single skaters
Living people
Sportspeople from Kyiv